The 2020 United States House of Representatives elections in Kentucky was held on November 3, 2020, to elect the six U.S. representatives from the state of Kentucky, one from each of the state's six congressional districts. The elections coincided with the 2020 U.S. presidential election, as well as other elections to the House of Representatives, elections to the United States Senate and various state and local elections.

Overview

District 1

The 1st district takes in Western Kentucky, including Paducah, Hopkinsville, Murray, and Henderson. The incumbent is Republican James Comer, who was re-elected with 68.6% of the vote.

Republican primary

Candidates

Declared
James Comer, incumbent U.S. Representative

Democratic primary

Candidates

Declared
James Rhodes

General election

Predictions

Results

District 2

The 2nd district encompasses west-central Kentucky, taking in Bowling Green, Owensboro, and Elizabethtown. The incumbent is Republican Brett Guthrie, who was re-elected with 66.7% of the vote in 2018.

Republican primary

Candidates

Declared
Kathleen Free
Brett Guthrie, incumbent U.S. Representative

Primary results

Democratic primary

Candidates

Declared
Hank Linderman, nominee for Kentucky's 2nd congressional district in 2018

Third parties

Libertarian Party
Robert Lee Perry

Populist Party
Lewis Carter

General election

Predictions

Results

District 3

The 3rd district encompasses nearly all of the Louisville metropolitan area. The incumbent is Democrat John Yarmuth, who was re-elected with 62.1% of the vote in 2018.

Democratic primary

Candidates

Declared
John Yarmuth, incumbent U.S. Representative

Republican primary

Candidates

Declared
Mike Craven, activist and candidate for Kentucky's 3rd congressional district in 2018
Waymen Eddings, businessman
Rhonda Palazzo, realtor and candidate for Kentucky's 3rd congressional district in 2018

Primary results

General election

Predictions

Results

District 4

The 4th district is located in the northeastern part of the state along the Ohio River, including the suburbs of Cincinnati and a small part of Louisville. The incumbent is Republican Thomas Massie, who was re-elected with 62.2% of the vote in 2018.

Republican primary

Candidates

Declared
Thomas Massie, incumbent U.S. Representative
Todd McMurtry, attorney

Declined
Kim Moser, state representative

Endorsements

Polling

with Generic Republican

Primary results

Democratic primary

Candidates

Declared
Shannon Fabert, business consultant
Alexandra Owensby, nurse practitioner

Primary results

General election

Predictions

Results

District 5

The 5th district, one of the poorest and most rural in the country, is based in the coalfields of eastern Kentucky. The incumbent is Republican Hal Rogers, who was re-elected with 78.9% of the vote in 2018.

Republican primary

Candidates

Declared
Hal Rogers, incumbent U.S. Representative
Geraldo Serrano, farmer and candidate for Kentucky's 5th congressional district in 2018

Primary results

Democratic primary

Candidates

Declared
Matthew Best

Declined
Rocky Adkins, minority leader of the Kentucky House of Representatives and candidate for Governor of Kentucky in 2019

General election

Predictions

Results

District 6

The 6th district is located in central Kentucky, taking in Lexington, Richmond, and Frankfort. The incumbent is Republican Andy Barr, who was re-elected with 51.0% of the vote in 2018.

Republican primary

Candidates

Declared
Andy Barr, incumbent U.S. Representative
Chuck Eddy, retired salesman
Geoff Young, perennial candidate and assistant director

Primary results

Democratic primary

Candidates

Declared
Josh Hicks, attorney and U.S. Marine veteran
Daniel Kemph, business analyst and candidate for Kentucky's 6th congressional district in 2018

Primary results

General election

Endorsements

Predictions

Polling

Results

See also
 2020 Kentucky elections

Notes

Partisan clients

References

External links
 
 
  (State affiliate of the U.S. League of Women Voters)
 

Official campaign websites for 1st district candidates
 James Comer (R) for Congress
 James Rhodes (D) for Congress 

Official campaign websites for 2nd district candidates
 Brett Guthrie (R) for Congress
 Hank Linderman (D) for Congress
 Robert Lee Perry (L) for Congress

Official campaign websites for 3rd district candidates
 Rhonda Palazzo (R) for Congress 
 John Yarmuth (D) for Congress

Official campaign websites for 4th district candidates
 Thomas Massie (R) for Congress
 Alexandra Owensby (D) for Congress 

Official campaign websites for 5th district candidates
 Hal Rogers (R) for Congress

Official campaign websites for 6th district candidates
 Andy Barr (R) for Congress
 Josh Hicks (D) for Congress 

2020
Kentucky
United States House of Representatives